North Main Street may refer to

 North Main Street (Cork)
 North Main Street Historic District (disambiguation), multiple locations with this name

See also
Main Street (disambiguation)